Fixer (Styled as FiXeR) is the sixth studio LP by the electronic group Download. It is the first full-length album featuring all new material since 2000's Effector. It is also notable for featuring an appearance from former band member, Mark Spybey, who left the band after touring in support of 1996's The Eyes of Stanley Pain.

Initially given a limited release of 1000 copies as part of Subconscious Communications' From The Vault II series, Fixer eventually sold out and, in 2011, was given a second pressing and a wider release through Metropolis Records. This new pressing is fundamentally the same as the first, with the exception of different album art.

During the production of this album, demos were posted on the group's MySpace account under various working titles including: "Gos", "Asspipe", "PE", "Heavy", "Pig & Turkey", "V Steak" and "Dirty".

Track listing

Personnel
cEvin Key
Phil Western

Guests
Mark Spybey (3, 10)
Dre "Databomb" Robinson (10)
Otto Von Schirach (9)

Design
Allen Jaeger & Simon Paul - sleeve design, layout

References 

2007 albums
Download (band) albums